The Day, the Night, the Dawn, the Dusk is an album by the Pakistani musician Nusrat Fateh Ali Khan, released in 1991.

Critical reception

The Washington Post wrote that "the lyrics, which embrace both Sufi mysticism and more down-to-earth matters of the heart, are sung, chanted and declaimed, adding to qawwali's alternately hypnotic and cathartic appeal and easily compensating for the language barrier."

Track listing 
All tracks written by Nusrat Fateh Ali Khan.

 "Halka Halka Suroor" – 18:43
 "Mera Piya Ghar Aaya" – 7:59
 "Main Jana Jogi De Naal"  – 26:57

Personnel 
Nusrat Fateh Ali Khan - vocals
Tim Hall - photography
Anita Karl - artwork, cover design, hand lettering
Robert Vosgien - digital mastering

References 

Nusrat Fateh Ali Khan albums
1991 albums
Shanachie Records albums